Fairfax Township is a township in Linn County, Iowa.

History
Fairfax Township was organized in 1858.

References

Townships in Linn County, Iowa
Townships in Iowa
1858 establishments in Iowa
Populated places established in 1858